Coachella Valley is a valley in California, United States.

Coachella Valley may also refer to:

 Coachella Valley Unified School District, a public school district serving areas of the Coachella Valley
 Coachella Valley High School, a high school in the Coachella Valley Unified School District
 Coachella Valley Music and Arts Festival, held in Indio, California

See also
 
 Coachella (disambiguation)

fr:Coachella
sv:Coachella